Upper Greenwich Friends Meetinghouse (Mickleton Friends Meetinghouse) is a historic Quaker meeting house at 413 Kings Highway, in the Mickleton section of East Greenwich Township, Gloucester County, New Jersey, United States.

It was built in 1799 and added to the National Register of Historic Places in 1997.

See also
National Register of Historic Places listings in Gloucester County, New Jersey

References

Quaker meeting houses in New Jersey
Churches on the National Register of Historic Places in New Jersey
Federal architecture in New Jersey
Churches completed in 1799
Churches in Gloucester County, New Jersey
National Register of Historic Places in Gloucester County, New Jersey
New Jersey Register of Historic Places
18th-century Quaker meeting houses
East Greenwich Township, New Jersey